Pécs (also known by other alternative names) is the fifth largest city in Hungary, on the slopes of the Mecsek mountains in the country's southwest, close to its border with Croatia. It is the administrative and economic centre of Baranya County, and the seat of the Roman Catholic Diocese of Pécs.

A city dating back to ancient times, settled by the Celts and the Romans, it was made an episcopal see in early medieval Hungary. It has the oldest university in the country, and is one of its major cultural centers. It has a rich cultural heritage from the age of a 150-year Ottoman occupation. It is historically a multi-ethnic city where many cultures have interacted through 2000 years of history. In recent times, it has been recognized for its cultural heritage, including being named as one of the European Capital of Culture cities.

Name 
The earliest name for the territory was its Roman name of Sopianæ. The name possibly comes from the plural of the Celtic sop meaning "marsh". Contrary to the popular belief, the name did not signify a single city, and there are no traces of an encircling wall from the early Roman era, only from the 4th century.

The medieval city was first mentioned in 871 under the name  ("five cathedrals".) The name refers to the fact that when constructing the churches of the city, the builders used material from five old Christian chapels. In later Latin documents the city was mentioned as Quinque Ecclesiae ("five churches", a name identical in meaning to the German name Fünfkirchen and the Slovak name ).

The name Pécs appears in documents in 1235 in the word Pechyut (with modern spelling: pécsi út, meaning "road to/from Pécs") most likely derives from the Proto-Slavic *pęčь or from the Illyrian *penče, both meaning five. In other languages: in Latin, Quinque Ecclesiae; in Italian, Cinquechiese; in Croatian, Pečuh; in Serbian,  (Pečuj); in Slovak, Päťkostolie; in Czech, ; in Dutch, ; in German, Fünfkirchen; and in Turkish, Peçuy.

Geography 
Pécs is located in the Carpathian Basin of Central Europe, in the center of the southern Hungarian county of Baranya. It is bordered by the Mecsek hills to the north, and by a rolling plain to the south. Pécs has a significant mining past. Mecsek dolomitic water is famous for its high density of minerals at constant poise.

The city of Pécs is located near to the border of Croatia. Its southern part is rather flat whereas its northern part clings to the slope of the Mecsek mountains. It has a very favorable climate, and is bordered by a flourishing woody area. During hot summer nights a cooling air streams down from Mecsek to clean the air of the city.

Pécs is bordered by plains to the south (elevation 120–130 m), while the Mecsek mountains rise up to elevations of 400–600 meters behind the city. Jakab-hill, located in the western Mecsek, is 592 m (1942 ft) tall, Tubes, straight above Pécs, is 612 m (2008 ft) tall, and Misina is 535 m (1755 ft) tall. Higher parts of the city climb up to 200–250 m (656 to 820 ft), mainly Pécsbánya, Szabolcsfalu, Vasas and Somogy. Woody areas generally start from elevations of about 300 m (984 ft). The Mecsek hills are marked by numerous valleys which play a key role in ameliorating the climate of the city in the absence of lakes and rivers. Waters coming down from the Mecsek hills flow into the Pécsi stream under the east–west rail road leading them eventually to the Danube.

History

Ancient Roman city 

The area has been inhabited since ancient times, with the oldest archaeological findings being 6,000 years old. Before the Roman era the place was inhabited by Celts.

The city of Sopianae was founded by Romans at the beginning of the 2nd century, in an area peopled by Celts and Pannoni tribes. By the 4th century, it became the capital of Valeria province and a significant early Christian center. The early Christian necropolis from that era became a UNESCO World Heritage Site in December 2000.

When Western Hungary was a province of the Roman Empire (named Pannonia), the Romans founded several wine-producing colonies under the collective name of Sopianae where Pécs now stands, in the early 2nd century.

The centre of Sopianae was where the Bishop's Palace now stands. Some parts of the Roman aqueduct are still visible. When Pannonia province was divided into four administrative divisions, Sopianae was the capital of the division named Valeria.

In the first half of the 4th century, Sopianae became an important Christian city. The first Christian cemeteries, dating back to this age, are inscribed on the World Heritage List. By the end of the century, Roman rule weakened in the area, mostly due to attacks by Barbarians and Huns.

Early medieval city 
When Charlemagne arrived in the area in 791, it was ruled by the Avars. Charlemagne, after conquering the area, annexed it to the Holy Roman Empire. It belonged to the Diocese of Salzburg.

A document written in Salzburg in 871 is the first document mentioning the early medieval city under the name Quinque Basilicae (see above).) During the 9th century, the city was inhabited by Slavic and Avar peoples and was part of the Balaton Principality, a Frankish vassal state.

The Hungarian city in the Middle Ages 

According to György Györffy's theory of place names, after the Hungarians conquered the Carpathian Basin, they retained a semi-nomadic lifestyle, changing pastures between winter and summer. Árpád's winter quarters – clearly after his occupation of Pannonia in 900 – were perhaps in Pécs.  Later, when the Comitatus of Baranya was established, the capital of the comitatus was not Pécs but a nearby castle, Baranyavár ('Baranya Castle'). Pécs, however, became an important religious centre and episcopal seat. In Latin documents, the city was mentioned as Quinque Ecclesiae. Around 1000, the area was inhabited by the Black Magyars. The Deed of Foundation of the Diocese of Pécs was issued in 1009.

The Roman Catholic Diocese of Pécs was founded in 1009 by Stephen I, and the first university in Hungary was founded in Pécs in 1367 by Louis I the Great. (The largest university still resides in Pécs with about 34,000 students.)

Peter Orseolo, the second king of Hungary, was buried in the cathedral in 1046. The location of his grave is unknown. This is because in 1064, when King Solomon made peace with his cousin, the later King Géza I, they celebrated Easter in Pécs. Shortly after the cathedral burnt down. The cathedral that stands today was built after this, in the second half of the 11th century.

Several religious orders settled down in Pécs. The Benedictine order was the first in 1076. In 1181, there was already a hospital in the city. The first Dominican monastery of the country was built in Pécs in 1238.

King Louis the Great founded a university in Pécs in 1367 following the advice of William, the bishop of Pécs, who was also the king's chancellor. It was the first university in Hungary. The founding document is almost word for word identical with that of the University of Vienna, stating that the university has the right to teach all arts and sciences, with the exception of theology.

In 1459, Janus Pannonius, the most important medieval poet of Hungary became the bishop of Pécs. He strengthened the cultural importance of the city.

Pécs was formed into one of the cultural and arts center of the country by bishop Janus Pannonius, great humanist poet.

Pécs under Ottoman rule 

After the Battle of Mohács (1526) in which the invading Ottoman army defeated the armies of King Louis II, the armies of Suleiman occupied Pécs.
Not only was a large part of the country occupied by Ottomans, the public opinion of who should be the king of Hungary was divided, too. One party supported Ferdinand of Habsburg, the other party crowned John Zápolya in Székesfehérvár. The citizens of Pécs supported Emperor Ferdinand, but the rest of Baranya county supported King John. In the summer of 1527 Ferdinand defeated the armies of Szapolyai and was crowned king on November 3. Ferdinand favoured the city because of their support, and exempted Pécs from paying taxes. Pécs was rebuilt and fortified.

In 1529, the Ottomans captured Pécs again, and went on a campaign against Vienna. The Ottomans forced Pécs to accept King John (who was allied with them) as their ruler. John died in 1540. In 1541, the Ottomans occupied the castle of Buda, and ordered Isabella, the widow of John to give Pécs to them, since the city was of strategic importance. The citizens of Pécs defended the city against the Ottomans, and swore loyalty to Ferdinand. The emperor helped the city and defended it from further Ottoman attacks, but his advisers persuaded him into focusing more on the cities of Székesfehérvár and Esztergom instead of Pécs. Pécs was preparing for the siege, but a day before, Flemish and Walloon mercenaries fled from the city, and raided the nearby lands. The next day in June 1543 the Bishop himself went to the Ottomans with the keys of the city.

After occupying the city, the Ottomans fortified it and turned it into a real Ottoman city. The Christian churches were turned into mosques; Turkish baths and minarets were built, Qur'an schools were founded, there was a bazaar in place of the market. For a hundred years the city was an island of peace in a land of war. It was a sanjak centre in Budin Eyalet at first and Kanije Eyalet later as "Peçuy".

The Ottoman era resulted in numerous landmarks, such as the mosque of Pasha Qasim the Victorious on Széchenyi square, the Tomb of İdris Baba, and the Yakovalı Hasan Paşa Mosque.

The Ottoman chronicler İbrahim Peçevi (Ibrahim of Pécs), whose work forms the main body of reference for Ottoman history between 1520 and 1640, was a native of the city.

In 1664, Croat-Hungarian nobleman Nicholas Zrínyi arrived in Pécs, with his army. Since the city was well into the Ottoman territories, they knew that even if they occupy it, they could not keep it for long, so they planned only to pillage it. They ravaged and burned the city but could not occupy the castle. Mediaeval Pécs was destroyed forever, except the wall encircling the historical city, a single bastion (Barbakán), the network of tunnels and catacombs beneath the city, parts of which are closed down, other parts are in possession of the famous Litke champagne factory, and can be visited today.  Several Turkish artifacts also survived, namely three mosques, two minarets, remnants of a bath over the ancient Christian tombs near the cathedral, and several houses, one even with a stone cannonball embedded in the wall.

After the castle of Buda was wrested from Ottoman rule in 1686, the armies went to capture the rest of Pécs. The advance guards could break into the city and pillaged it. The Ottomans saw that they could not hold the city, and burnt it, and withdrew into the castle. The army led by Louis of Baden occupied the city on 14 October and destroyed the aqueduct leading to the castle. The Ottomans had no other choice but to surrender, which they did on 22 October (see Siege of Pécs).

The city was under martial law under the command of Karl von Thüngen. The Viennese court wanted to destroy the city first, but later they decided to keep it to counterbalance the importance of Szigetvár, which was still under Ottoman rule. Slowly the city started to prosper again, but in the 1690s two plague epidemics claimed many lives. In 1688 German settlers arrived. Only about one-quarter of the city's population was Hungarian, the others were Germans or Southern Slavs. Census of taxpayers from 1698 lists 637 families for which  Janja Živković Mandić concludes that 308 were of Croatian nationality (Catholics Croats, Racs, Šokci, Bunjevci, Illyrians, Slavs, Bosniaks) and the remaining 329 were Hungarians, Germans, Serbs or Greeks. According to same census István Tabo mentions 171 Hungarian, 349 Slavs and 79 Germans while Đuro Šarošac mentions that at that time in the city lived 325 Croats, 139 Hungarians, 92 Germans, 53 Vlachs and 28 Serbs. According to 1698 data, South Slavs comprised more than half of the population of the town. Because Hungarians were only a minority of the population, Pécs did not support the revolution against Habsburg rule led by Francis II Rákóczi, and his armies pillaged the city in 1704.

Pécs in early-modern times 

A more peaceful era started after 1710. Industry, trade and viticulture prospered, manufactures were founded, a new city hall was built. The feudal lord of the city was the Bishop of Pécs, but the city wanted to free itself from episcopal control. Bishop George Klimó, an enlightened man (who founded the first public library of the country) would have agreed to cede his rights to the city, but the Holy See forbade him to do so. When Klimó died in 1777, Queen Maria Theresa quickly elevated Pécs to free royal town status before the new bishop was elected. This cost the city 83,315 forints.

According to the first census (held in 1787 by the order of Joseph II), there were 1,474 houses and 1,834 families in Pécs, a total of 8,853 residents, of which 133 were priests and 117 were noblemen.

In 1785, the Academy of Győr was moved to Pécs. This academy eventually evolved into a law school. The first stonework theatre of the city was built in 1839.
At that time or Maria Theresia and her son Josef II, the Danube Swabians from Germany was settled in the City.

Pécs during the 19th century and later 
The industry developed a lot in the second half of the 19th century. By 1848, there were 1,739 industrial workers. Some of the manufactures were nationally famous. The iron and paper factories were among the most modern ones of the age. Coal mining was relevant. A sugar factory and beer manufactures were built, too. The city had 14,616 residents.

During the revolution in 1848–49, Pécs was occupied by Croatian armies for a short time, but it was freed from them by Habsburg armies in January 1849.

After the Austro-Hungarian Compromise of 1867 Pécs developed, like all the other cities and towns of the country. From 1867, Pécs is connected to the nearby town Barcs by railway, and since 1882 it is also connected to Budapest. In 1913, a tram system has been founded, but it was extinguished in 1960.

At the end of World War I, Baranya county was occupied by Serbian troops, and it was not until August 1921 that Pécs could be sure that it remains part of Hungary. The University of Pressburg (modern-day Bratislava, Slovakia) was moved to Pécs after Hungary lost Pressburg according to the Treaty of Trianon.

During World War II, Pécs was captured by Soviet troops of the 3rd Ukrainian Front on 29 November 1944 in the course of the Budapest Offensive. Until the end of World War II, the majority Inhabitants was Danube Swabians. Some of the former German Settlers was expelled to Germany and Austria in 1945-1948, about the Potsdam Agreement. Germans of Hungary are still a minority in the City.

A history of Hungary from 1945-1990, "under Soviet domination" can be found in A Concise History of Hungary. After the war, development became fast again, and the city grew, absorbing several nearby towns. In the 1980s, Pécs already had 180,000 inhabitants.

After the end of Socialist era (1989–1990), Pécs and its county, like many other areas, were hit hard by the changes, the unemployment rate was high, the mines and several factories were closed, and the war in neighboring Yugoslavia in the 1990s affected the tourism.

Pécs was also the centre of the Nordic Support Group (NSG) consisting of units from Denmark, Norway, Sweden, Finland, and Poland, as part of the IFOR and later SFOR NATO deployments, after the Dayton Agreement and following peace in former Yugoslavia; the first units were deployed to Pécs in late 1995 and early 1996. The NSG handled the relaying of supply, personnel and other logistical tasks between the participating countries and their deployed forces in Bosnia-Herzegovina.

In 1998 Pécs was given the UNESCO prize "Cities for Peace" for maintaining its cultural minorities, and also for its tolerant and helping attitude toward refugees of the Yugoslav Wars.

In 2007 Pécs was third, and in 2008 it was second "Livable City" (The LivCom Awards) in the category of cities between 75,000 and 200,000 inhabitants.

In 2010, Pécs was selected to be the European Capital of Culture alongside Essen and Istanbul. The city motto is "The Borderless City". After receiving the title major renewal started in the city. Renewed public places, streets, squares and neighbourhoods, new cultural centers, a concert hall, a new library and center and a cultural quarter were designed.

Main sights 

A good example of the city's history and interesting past can be seen in the main square, where the Gazi Kasim Mosque still stands, and, although consecrated as a church following the retreat of the Ottoman Turks centuries ago, the crescent moon of Islam is still visible on the cupola, surmounted by a cross. Indeed, Pécs is the richest town in Hungary in terms of Turkish architecture, with the ruins of Memi Pasa's Baths and the mausoleum of miracle worker Idris Baba, just two other notable remains. The Yakovalı Hasan Paşa Mosque, dating from the mid-1500s, still functions as an active mosque today. It is open to the public except during Friday services from 2.30 to 3.30 pm.
 Necropolis of Sopianae (UNESCO World Heritage Site)
 Cella Septichora (4th century)
 The Cathedral (11th century, renovated in the 19th century).
 Hungarian Bishop's Palace (12th century)
 University of Pécs (1367), building of the Faculty of Science and Faculty of Humanities in Ifjúság street. It includes a Botanical Garden.
 Klimo Library (1774). The first public library in Hungary, which was founded by bishop George Klimo.
 Barbakán "Tower" (15th century)
 Ruins in Tettye (1505–1521)
 Széchenyi square (main square)
 The mosque of pasha Qasim (1543–1546). Originally gothic Church: St. Bertalan Cathedral from the 13th century
 Yakovalı Hasan Paşa Mosque (16th century)
 Downtown (Houses from the Middle Ages. Baroque, Classicism, Rococo, Art Nouveau Houses)
 Nádor Hotel (1846) in Széchenyi Square
 County House in Széchenyi Square
 City Hall in Széchenyi Square
 Synagogue (1869)
 Building of the Hungarian Academy of Sciences (1884)
 National Theatre of Pécs (Nemzeti Színház), inaugurated in 1895.
 Eosin glaze of Zsolnay fountain
 Posta (Post) Palace
 Hungaricum House
 Janus Pannonius Museum
 Renaissance Museum
 Csontváry Museum
 Zsolnay Museum
 Victor Vasarely Museum
 Amerigo Tot Museum
 Ethnographic Museum in Pécs
 Natural History Museum in Pécs
 Szerecsen Chemist's Museum
 Gallery of Pécs
 Museum Street
 Zsolnay Mausoleum
 Bóbita (punch and judy show)
 Janus (Pannonius) Theatre
 Croatian Theatre in Pécs
 Third Theatre
 Zoological Garden in Pécs
 Love padlocks
 Magasház (formerly – was deconstructed in 2016)
 TV-Tower in Mecsek Mountain (1960)

Demographics
The majority of the citizens with 84.0% are Hungarians according to the 2011 census. The city's Germans are the largest minority with 4.2%. Followed by the Roma (2.0%), the Croats (1.2%) and the Romanians (0.2%).

The largest religious group is the Catholics with 39.7% Roman Catholic and 0.3% Greek Catholic. The second largest denomination is the Calvinists (5.2%), the third the Lutherans (1.3%). 27.8% of the population is non-religious.

Due to the number of international students studying and living in Pécs, a notable diversity of non-permanent citizens could be obviously seen around the city.

Climate

Economy 

Historically Pécs was well known in Hungary for its industry with several factories, but after the fall of the Iron Curtain many have not managed the economic transition well and went bankrupt (e.g. Pécsi Kesztyűgyár, Pécsi Bőrgyár, Littke Pezsgőgyár etc.). Until some years ago, it had a coal and uranium mine, now only its sand mine exists and is operated by the Hungarian-owned Quartz mining company.

The nationally (and to a limited extent internationally) famous porcelain factory, the Zsolnay Porcelain is the greatest pride of Pécs. The walls and roofs of several public and private buildings in the city are decorated with the company's porcelains contributing to Pécs's unique cityscape.

The Pécsi Sörfőzde (Pécs Brewery) is one of the four main Hungarian breweries (the others being Dreher Breweries, Borsod Brewery, Heineken Hungária), but the only one of them owned fully by Hungarians. It produces a special beer, that is known for not being strained before bottling.

The Hungarian textilmanufacturer Rovitex Hungária, the American crane manufacturer Terex, the Hungarian scale manufacturer Pécsi Mérlegstúdió, the Hungarian furniture manufacturer Megyeri Bútor, the Hungarian cutting-tool manufacturer FORSZ, the German switchboard manufacturer HB-Kapcsolószekrénygyártó (part of the Bader Gruppe), the Hungarian recycling company Alcufer, the Hungarian agricultural vehiclemanufacturer HIDROT, the Hungarian animal husbandry tool manufacturer Önitató, the tobacco factory Pécsi Dohánygyár (owned by British American Tobacco), the Hungarian automotive spare parts manufacturer Matro, the Hungarian safe manufacturer Strauss Metal, the Hungarian packaging machine manufacturer SOMAPAK, the Hungarian plastics producer Termoplast, the Bocz Printing House, the Hungarian pickles manufacturer Babina, the Hungarian plastic product manufacturer Karsai Pécs, the Hungarian metal manufacturer Riner Metal based there and have their production facilities in the city.

There is a gradual development of modern high-tech industry, with Finnish electronics manufacturing company Elcoteq the largest industrial employer in the city, the Hungarian Z Elektronika electronics manufacturer and the Hungarian TG Netcom IT network manufacturer.

The German transportation company, Dachser has a logistics centre in Pécs.

The Biokom waste management and recycling company (owned by the city) is responsible for the transport and recycling of waste in the whole territory of Pécs and the surrounding areas. The energy used in the settlement is produced mainly by the two biomass power plants of Pannonpower (part of Veolia) which consists of a 49,9 MW woodchip-fired and a 35 MW agricultural by-product-fired powerplants. The country's largest solar cell field is also in Pécs, thanks to the city's southern location and longer sunny hours, which can produce about 10 MW energy a year. The solar power plant is operated by MVM Hungarowind (part of the MVM Group).

The Expo Center Pécs Exhibition and Conference Centre provides place for international exhibitions and conferences.

Education 
The University of Pécs was founded by Louis I of Hungary in 1367. It is the oldest university in Hungary, and is among the first European universities. In the recent past it used to be divided in two universities, one for Medicine and Orthodontics (POTE) and a larger one for other studies: JPTE (Janus Pannonius Tudományegyetem). The POTE (Pécs University Medical School, now known as the Medical School) has a large English program for general medicine and dentistry (with students from America, Asia, Africa, and European countries - including many Scandinavians) and a new German program. On 1 January 2000 these universities were combined under the name University of Pécs (acronym: PTE - Pécsi Tudományegyetem - University of Pécs). Nowadays, the University of Pécs has become the most internationalized university in Hungary with around 5000 international students out of the total of approximately 20000 students (around 25%).

Politics 
The current mayor of Pécs is Attila Péterffy (Pécs Jövője, Öt Torony).

The local Municipal Assembly, elected at the 2019 local government elections, is made up of 26 members (1 Mayor, 18 Individual constituencies MEPs and 7 Compensation List MEPs) divided into this political parties and alliances:
Fidesz policies in Pécs have included a law making homelessness illegal (2014) and an official call to property owners not to make space available for an NGO supported by OSF (2017).

List of mayors
List of City Mayors from 1990:

Transport

Roads 
 The M6/M60 motorway connects Pécs and Budapest with the driving time between the two cities taking about  hours now. The entire route opened on 31 March 2010. Route 6 crosses the city giving it an east–west axle and leaves it towards Barcs by the Croatian border. Secondary routes are:
 Route 57: Pécs - Mohács,
 Route 58: Pécs - Drávaszabolcs,
 Route 66: Pécs - Kaposvár.

Railway 
Pécs is connected to Budapest through Pusztaszabolcs, and has direct connections to Mohács, Nagykanizsa.

Designed by Ferenc Pfaff, the main railway station was built in 1900 and became a listed building in 2008. The building itself was built in the style of Renaissance Eclecticism, and it features reliefs depicting James Watt and George Stephenson designed by Klein Ármin and made by Zsolnay factory A mass transit hub -including a bus terminal, a bus stop and a cab rank zone- is situated on the square in front of the railway station.

Tram 
A tram formerly operated in the city from 1914 to 1960.

Buses 

Buses are the primary form of public transport in the city.

Airport 
A new airport opened in Pécs Pécs-Pogány International Airport in March 2006. Its main traffic is supplied by smaller charter planes.

Sport 
Pécsi MFC, football club playing in the Nemzeti Bajnokság II
Pécsi Vasutas SK, football club playing in the Baranya megye (regional) league
PEAC-Pécs first-class women's professional basketball team
Pécsi VSK, men's water polo team
Pécsi Indiánok SK, rugby club

Notable people born in Pécs 

 Károly Balogh Mankóbüki president of the Royal Court of Pécs.
 Marcel Breuer, architect and furniture designer
 Pál Dárdai, football player
 Petar Dobrović, Serb painter and president of the short-lived Baranya-Baja Republic
 József Eötvös (musician), guitarist
 Dezső Ernster, Metropolitan Opera bass
 Sigismund Ernuszt, bishop of Pécs
 Lipót Fejér, mathematician
Alfréd (Fred) Forbát, Bauhaus architect
 Zoltán Gera, football player
 Leopold Hirschfeld, brewer, founder of the Pécsi Sörfőzde
 János Horvay, sculptor
 Katinka Hosszú, swimmer, 3 x gold medallist at the 2016 Olympic Games
 Zsuzsanna Jakabos, swimmer
 Jenő Jandó, pianist
 György Klimó, bishop of Pécs, founder of press and public library
 Dezső Lauber, sportsman and architect
László Lénárd, neuroscientist, physician
 Kató Lomb, interpreter, language master
 Maximinus (Praetorian Prefect)
 Farkas Molnár (1897–1945) was a Hungarian architect, painter, essayist, and graphic artist.
 Janus Pannonius, bishop of Pécs
 İbrahim Peçevi (Ibrahim of Pécs), Ottoman historian and chronicler
 Karl (Freiherr) von Pflanzer-Baltin
 Anton von Rosas, ophthalmologist
 Joe Rudán, singer
 László Sólyom, president of Hungary
 Béla Tarr, film director
 Olga Tass, Olympic gymnast
 Victor Vasarely, artist
 Balázs Zamostny (born in 1992), Hungarian footballer

Twin towns – sister cities

Pécs is twinned with:

 Arad, Romania
 Beyoğlu, Turkey
 Cluj-Napoca, Romania
 Fellbach, Germany
 Graz, Austria
 Kraków, Poland
 Kütahya, Turkey
 Lahti, Finland

 Novi Sad, Serbia
 Olomouc, Czech Republic
 Osijek, Croatia
 Seattle, United States
 Shiraz, Iran
 Shkodër, Albania
 Sliven, Bulgaria
 Terracina, Italy
 Tucson, United States
 Tuzla, Bosnia and Herzegovina
 Zagreb, Croatia

The city also has an informal friendship link with Peterborough, England.

Gallery

See also 
 Love padlocks
 Music of Pécs
 Pécs Brewery
 Lake Pécs

References 
 History of Pécs 

Notes

External links 

 Official homepage
 Baranya County Museums' Directorate
 Pécs in 360 panoramic images
 Aerial photography: Pécs
 Glas Koncila Hrvatska nazočnost u "gradu s pet crkava", Oct 7, 2007 (page about Croats in Pécs)
 Mecsek-1956-History
 Pécs szállás (accommodation)
 Pécs at funiq.hu 
 Csakis itt Pécsen! – videoclip

 
County seats in Hungary
Cities with county rights of Hungary
Populated places in Baranya County
World Heritage Sites in Hungary
Baranya (region)
History of Baranya (region)
Hungarian German communities
Roman settlements in Hungary